Threat to Survival is the fifth studio album by American rock band Shinedown. It was announced on August 7, 2015 that the album would be released on September 18, 2015. Four singles were released from the album, "Cut the Cord", "State of My Head", "Asking for It", and "How Did You Love". "Black Cadillac" was also released as a promotional song prior to the album's release as well. In February 2018, the album was certified Gold by the RIAA, indicating 500,000 copies sold in the US.

Reception

Reception for the album from critics has been mixed. The staff review for Sputnikmusic panned the album for "a complete lack of substance", stating that "The melodies just aren't flowing and the choruses are rarely memorable. The instrumentation is lacking to say the least, and their brand new ideas are questionable at best. There's absolutely no lyrical, emotional, or musical substance", while conceding that "Cut the Cord" still managed to be one of the band's best singles. AllMusic was less negative, conceding that "If anything, Threat to Survival proves that Shinedown still have plenty of gas left in the tank, and while the occasional foray into the shallower end of the mainstream may divide some listeners, there's enough here to keep longtime followers satiated..."

Track listing

Personnel

Shinedown
 Brent Smith – lead vocals
 Zach Myers – guitar, backing vocals
 Eric Bass – bass, backing vocals, additional production, engineering, production and recording on "Cut the Cord"
 Barry Kerch – drums, percussion

Additional musicians
 Patrick Warren – Chamberlain, synths and programming on "Misfits" and "Thick as Thieves"
 Lynn Mabry and Sheree Brown – backing vocals on "Black Cadillac" and "Oblivion"
 Delaney McLernon – additional vocals on "Cut the Cord"

Technical personnel
 Steve Robertson – A&R
 Anne DeClemente and Craig Rosen – A&R administration
 Anthony Delia – marketing
 Mark Obriski – art direction & design
 Darren Doane – band photography
 Alex Kirzhner – back of booklet illustration
 Josh Skubel – packaging production
 Bill McGathy and Gwyther Bultman (In De Goot Entertainment) – management
 Ron Opaleski (William Morris Endeavor) – booking
 Jess Rosen – legal representation
 David Weise, Beth Sabbagh, Laurie Davis (David Weise & Associates) – business management
 Dave Bassett – production on "Asking For It", "Outcast", "It All Adds Up", "Oblivion", "Thick as Thieves", "Black Cadillac", and "Misfits", engineering, additional guitar, synths and programming, mixing on "It All Adds Up", "Oblivion" and "Thick as Thieves" at Chateau Relaxeau, Malibu, CA
 Dave Schiffman – engineering, mixing on "Outcast"
 Jake Gorski – assistant engineering
 Mike "Sack" Fasano – drum tech
 Alexander Arias – drum editing
 Francesco Cameli – engineering
 Rudá Carvalho – assistant engineering
 Hans Buscher – guitar tech
 Nigel Lundemo – vocal editing
 Pete Nappi – production and mixing on "State of My Head"
 Eric Rickert and Jeff Leonard Jr. – additional recording
 Scott "The Ninja" Stevens – production and mixing on "How Did You Love" and "Dangerous", additional instrumentation and engineering
 Chris Baseford – engineering, co-mixing
 Michael Eckes – assistant engineering
 Chris Lord-Alge – mixing on "Asking for It" and "Cut the Cord" at Mix LA, Tarzana, CA
 Jean-Marie Horvat – mixing on "Black Cadillac"
 Michael H. Brauer – mixing on "Misfits" at Electric Lady Studios, NYC
 Mark Bengtson and Steve Vealey – mixing assistants
 Ted Jensen – mastering at Sterling Sound, New York, NY

Charts

Weekly charts

Year-end charts

Certifications

References

2015 albums
Albums produced by Rob Cavallo
Atlantic Records albums
Shinedown albums